South Woodham Ferrers is a town and civil parish in the borough of Chelmsford, in the English county of Essex.

The town is situated east of Fenn Creek, near to where it meets the River Crouch. South Woodham Ferrers is part of the Maldon constituency represented by John Whittingdale MP.

History
The area now occupied by South Woodham Ferrers was sparsely populated farmland until the railway station opened in 1889. South Woodham Ferrers developed gradually around the station, with some of the farmland being parcelled up into plots for sale to individuals and developers. In 1974 Essex County Council adopted a masterplan to significantly expand South Woodham Ferrers with large housing estates and other facilities, including a new town centre.

The area remained part of the civil parish of Woodham Ferrers until 1 April 1987, when it was made a separate parish.

Many street names in the southwestern part of the town are taken from the works of J. R. R. Tolkien, such as Gandalf's Ride, Gimli Watch, Shirebourn Vale, Rivendell Vale, Celeborn Street, Hobbiton Hill and Arwen Grove.

South Woodham Ferrers has a weekly magazine called 'The South Woodham Focus', established in 2000.

Town centre 

The town centre has around 100 business units. Approximately 45% are retail premises, with the remainder being a combination of professional services (such as banks and estate agents) and dining locations such as cafés and restaurants.

The supermarket chain Asda opened a store in the town in 1978 which made them the principal retailer in the town. In 2001 Essex County Council sold the freehold for the majority of the town centre to Asda, who in turn sold a package of land and property to SW Investments. As a result of these sales, Asda own the town's car parks, Queen Elizabeth II Square and approximately one-third of the shop premises in the town centre. SW Investments owns most of the remaining areas in the town centre, including Market Square, with the remaining premises having a variety of private owners.

In 1981 Queen Elizabeth II opened the town square, which is named Queen Elizabeth II Square after her.

Schools 
The main secondary school in the town is William de Ferrers School, the first intake of which was in 1982. The town has five primary schools: Collingwood, Elmwood, St. Josephs RC, Trinity St. Mary's C of E and Woodville. Chetwood Primary School was closed in 2009 and was replaced by a Sure Start centre.

Bushy Hill 
Bushy Hill is part of South Woodham Ferrers town council area, and lies to the north of the town. The west face of Bushy Hill was covered in broad leafed woodland and known locally as "Little Wood". "Big Wood", officially named Hawe's Wood and also known as "Bluebell Wood", is closer to Edwin's Hall. Later the hill became known locally as "Radar Hill" due to having been visually dominated by a radar testing site. This site was operated by a number of the former Marconi companies including Alenia Marconi Systems, and more recently used by BAE Systems to develop various radar technologies, some of which are for military use. The site remains in use, but the large dish which earned the hill its nickname has been removed. The permissive footpath around the site passes the entrance sign warning of "helicopters landing, danger of radiation" and other such dangers associated with a working radar testing site. The inner workings of the site are secured with a gatehouse, anti-climb fencing and a number of CCTV cameras.

Bushy Hill was also known locally, before Marconi came to use it, as "Landslip Hill", referring to the south face of the hill which has slid away leaving a bare escarpment, clearly visible from the town.

Transport

Road
The town is connected by the A132 to the A130, A127 and other main routes.
The B1012 goes east to Southminster and Burnham-on-Crouch and the B1418 north to Danbury.

Rail
South Woodham Ferrers railway station is on the single-track Crouch Valley Line from Wickford to Southminster. The station was originally called "Woodham Ferris", being renamed "Woodham Ferrers" in 1913 before adopting its current name in 2007.

Ferry
There was a ferry crossing across the River Crouch to Hullbridge and other destinations.

Air
The town is about 10 km (6 miles) away from Southend Airport.

Music 
South Woodham Ferrers has two choirs. The men's choir was originally named after the town and now performs under the name of men2sing. The women's choir is The Swift Singers.

Governance

There are three tiers of local government covering South Woodham Ferrers, being South Woodham Ferrers Town Council at parish level, Chelmsford City Council at district level and Essex County Council at county level. The town council meets and has its offices at Champions Manor Hall on Hullbridge Road, which also serves as a community centre.

In Summer 2006, South Woodham Ferrers elected its first town mayor.

Sport 
South Woodham Ferrers Rugby Club has a Club House at Saltcoats Park, running teams at ages between under 7 and under 16. The youth section consists of under-17s and colts. There are three senior teams, a veterans' team and a ladies' team.

South Woodham Ferrers Cricket Club runs three teams in the T Rippon Mid-Essex League, playing home games at Purleigh CC and Salcoats Park.

South Woodham Ferrers has several amateur football teams, the largest being South Woodham Ferrers United FC. This is the biggest sports organisation in the town with 40+ teams ranging from 3 yrs up to and including adults' football. Others are William De Ferrers, Woodham Athletic & Woodham Radars.

Team Bentham is a South Woodham Ferrers-based skateboard team, which won the 2019 Essex wide 'Lord of the Swords' competition. It is named after English philosopher, jurist, and social reformer Jeremy Bentham.

Notable people 
 Terry Alderton, comedian, actor, and television presenter
 Gordon Southern, comedian
 James Harper, professional footballer
 Frank Bruno, professional boxer (used to train in South Woodham Ferrers rather than live according to local group)

References

External links 

 South Woodham Ferrers Town Council Website

 
Towns in Essex
Civil parishes in Essex